Cyprus participated in the Eurovision Song Contest 2005 with the song "Ela Ela (Come Baby)" written and performed by Constantinos Christoforou, who was selected by the Cypriot broadcaster Cyprus Broadcasting Corporation (CyBC) in November 2004 to represent Cyprus at the 2005 contest in Kyiv, Ukraine. CyBC organised a national final on 1 February 2005 in order to select the Cypriot song. The national final featured four songs and resulted in the selection of "Ela Ela" as the winning song.

As one of the ten highest placed finishers in 2004, Cyprus automatically qualified to compete in the final of the Eurovision Song Contest. Performing during the show in position 9, Cyprus placed eighteenth out of the 24 participating countries with 46 points.

Background

Prior to the 2005 contest, Cyprus had participated in the Eurovision Song Contest twenty-two times since their debut in the 1981 contest. Its best placing was fifth, which it achieved three times: in the 1982 competition with the song "Mono i agapi" performed by Anna Vissi, in the 1997 edition with "Mana mou" performed by Hara and Andreas Constantinou, and the 2004 contest with "Stronger Every Minute" performed by Lisa Andreas. Cyprus' least successful result was in the 1986 contest when it placed last with the song "Tora zo" by Elpida, receiving only four points in total. However, its worst finish in terms of points received was when it placed second to last in the 1999 contest with "Tha'nai erotas" by Marlain Angelidou, receiving only two points.

The Cypriot national broadcaster, Cyprus Broadcasting Corporation (CyBC), broadcasts the event within Cyprus and organises the selection process for the nation's entry. CyBC confirmed their intentions to participate at the 2005 Eurovision Song Contest on 9 September 2004. Cyprus has used internal selections and televised national finals to select the Cypriot entry in the past. In 2004, the broadcaster organised a national final to select the Cypriot entry. However, CyBC opted to internally select the artist for the 2005 contest and organise a national final to select the song.

Before Eurovision

Artist selection 
In early September 2004, it was revealed that CyBC had approached the group Hi-5 to represent Cyprus in Kyiv. However, the broadcaster later terminated negotiations with the group and announced Constantinos Christoforou as the Cypriot artist for the Eurovision Song Contest 2005 on 24 November 2004 after receiving a proposal from label EMI Greece. Christoforou previously represented Cyprus at the Eurovision Song Contest in 1996 as a solo act and 2002 as part of the group One, where he placed ninth and sixth with the songs "Mono gia mas" and "Gimme", respectively. CyBC also announced that a national final would be held in order to select his contest song.

National final 
Four songs, two written by Constantinos Christoforou himself and two written by Mike Connaris who composed the Cypriot Eurovision entry in 2004, were selected for the national final and announced on 28 January 2005. The national final took place on 1 February 2005 at the Monte Caputo Nightclub in Limassol, hosted by Tasos Tryfonos and Eleni Manousaki and broadcast on RIK 1, RIK Sat as well as online via cybc.cy. All four competing songs were performed by Constantinos Christoforou and the winning song, "Ela Ela", was selected by a combination of votes from a seven-member jury panel (40%) and a public televote (60%). Backing vocals for "Ela Ela" were provided by 1991 Cypriot Eurovision entrant Elena Patroklou. The members of the jury were Ruslana (Ukrainian Eurovision 2004 winner), Evridiki (Cypriot Eurovision representative in 1992 and 1994), Dimitris Korgialas (composer), Dafni Bokota (singer and television presenter), Evi Papamichail (Head of Delegation for Cyprus at Eurovision), Sokratis Soumelas (EMI Greece) and Nikos Nikolaou (actor). In addition to the performances of the competing songs, the show featured guest performances by Dimitris Korgialas, Evridiki and Ruslana.

At Eurovision
According to Eurovision rules, all nations with the exceptions of the host country, the "Big Four" (France, Germany, Spain and the United Kingdom), and the ten highest placed finishers in the 2004 contest are required to qualify from the semi-final on 19 May 2005 in order to compete for the final on 21 May 2005; the top ten countries from the semi-final progress to the final. As Cyprus finished fifth in the 2004 contest, the nation automatically qualified to compete in the final on 21 May 2005. On 22 March 2005, a special allocation draw was held which determined the running order for the semi-final and final, and Cyprus was set to perform in position 9 in the final, following the entry from Albania and before the entry from Spain. Constantinos Christoforou was joined on stage by Elina Konstantopoulou who represented Greece in 1995 during the final performance, and Cyprus placed eighteenth in the final scoring 46 points.

Both the semi-final and the final were broadcast in Cyprus on RIK 1 and RIK SAT with commentary by Evi Papamichail. The Cypriot spokesperson, who announced the Cypriot votes during the final, was Melani Steliou.

Voting 
Below is a breakdown of points awarded to Cyprus and awarded by Cyprus in the semi-final and grand final of the contest. The nation awarded its 12 points to Romania in the semi-final and to Greece in the final of the contest.

Points awarded to Cyprus

Points awarded by Cyprus

References

2005
Countries in the Eurovision Song Contest 2005
Eurovision